Karyme Lozano (born Karyme Lucía Virginia Lozano Carreno on April 3, 1978) is a Mexican actress. She has appeared on three covers of Los 50 Mas Bellos of People en Español. She has been nominated and won several awards for Best Actress including for Premios TVyNovelas and Las Palmas de Oro.

Career
Lozano is a well-known Mexican actress who has appeared in many Televisa telenovelas including Volver a Empezar (1994), Si Dios Me Quita La Vida (1995), Confidente de Secundaria (1997), Pueblo Chico, Infierno Grande (1998),  Amar Sin Límites, 1999–2000 series Tres mujeres, El Manantial, Niña amada mía (which aired on Univision simultaneously) and the Venevisión telenovela Soñar no Cuesta Nada, entirely shot in Miami, Florida.

TV series she has participated in include Mujeres Asesinas (HBO Latino) in its second season, the Colombian series Tiempo Final (Canal Fox), and Mujer, Casos de la Vida Real.

Lozano has also participated in theater in plays such as Anastasia, Cinderella and Grease, with the role of Sonia.

In 2004 she played the lead role in the film Desnudos, an artist physically and mentally abused by her boyfriend, a performance that earned her a nomination for an Ariel Award.

In 2010 Lozano made her debut on U.S. movie screens with For Greater Glory (Cristiada) alongside Eva Longoria and Andy Garcia. Later she wrote and directed her first short film, The True Meaning of Love, which was accepted by several film festivals in the United States.

In 2017 Lozano participated in the season finale episodes of Kevin Can Wait on CBS alongside Kevin James.

Lozano is represented by Shoreline Management as an actress, writer, and director.

Filmography

Awards and nominations

Premios TVyNovelas

References

External links
 
 Karyme Lozano - official website

1978 births
Living people
Mexican child actresses
Mexican Catholics
Mexican telenovela actresses
Mexican television actresses
Mexican film actresses
Actresses from Mexico City
20th-century Mexican actresses
21st-century Mexican actresses
People from Mexico City